Jawaharlal Nehru was sworn in as Prime Minister of India on 15 August 1947. After first Indian general election, Nehru became the first democratically elected Prime Minister of the country and his second term started on 15 April 1952. In his ministry upon reelection, the ministers were as follows.

Cabinet

Cabinet ministers

|}

Ministers of State

|}

References

Indian union ministries
1952 establishments in India
Nehru administration
Cabinets established in 1952
1957 disestablishments in India
Cabinets disestablished in 1957